Lemon & Paeroa, also known as L&P, is a sweet soft drink manufactured in New Zealand. Created in 1907, it was traditionally made by combining lemon juice with carbonated mineral water from the town of Paeroa, but is now owned and manufactured by multi-national Coca-Cola.

Lemon & Paeroa is a popular drink in New Zealand and is available in several Australian supermarkets, formerly sold in Gourmet Burger Kitchen restaurants in the United Kingdom, and in some specialty stores. L&P is used as a mixer in New Zealand bars, particularly with Southern Comfort.

The comically pretentious advertising slogan "World famous in New Zealand" has become a popular New Zealand saying. It is used to describe items that are famous within New Zealand but unknown in the rest of the world, and implies that similar items and people in larger countries would have a far higher media profile and would be famous worldwide.

In 2005 "Sweet As L&P" with artificial sweetener aspartame was introduced with the modified slogan "World Famous in New Zealand since quite recently", and the traditional product began being advertised as "World Famous in New Zealand since Ages ago".

History

Analysis of Paeroa mineral water by Arthur Wohlman in 1904 revealed magnesium bicarbonate in a concentration of 73 grains to the gallon (1040 mg/L). In 1908 the property containing the mineral spring was purchased by Robert Fewell and his brother-in-law Frank Brinkler.

Their company Paeroa Natural Mineral Water Company, bottled the spring water until 1915 when they sold the company to Menzies and Company who, in turn, opened a new factory in Paeroa in 1926. In the late 1940s 'Lemon and Paeroa' and 'Paeroa and Lemon' were both marketed. In 1963 Menzies and Co merged with Hamilton-based bottlers CL Innes, and L&P took on the Innes Tartan as a motif on the neck of the L&P bottle. This continued until the late 1970s, when L&P was taken over by Oasis Industries, before it was, in turn, taken over by Coca-Cola.

In the late 1980s, a collaboration of New Zealand music artists under the name '80 in the Shade'   recorded a cover of Martha and the Vandellas song (Love is Like A) Heat Wave, to promote the drink.

L&P itself is now made by Coca-Cola in Auckland, on the same production line as the company's other beverages. However, there is a giant L&P bottle in Paeroa near the site where the product was originally manufactured. The company has licensed an official L&P Kiwiana shop and café.

See also
 List of lemon dishes and beverages

References

New Zealand cuisine
New Zealand drinks
Coca-Cola brands
Lemon sodas
1908 introductions